Ceranesi is a comune (municipality) in the Metropolitan City of Genoa in the Italian region Liguria, located about  northwest of Genoa.

The Municipality of Ceranesi includes also the Shrine of N.S. della Guardia, the most important Marian shrine in Liguria.

Ceranesi borders the following municipalities: Bosio, Campomorone, Genoa.

References

External links
 Official website

Cities and towns in Liguria